Clark G. Kuebler (24 Mar 1908 – 28 Mar 1974 (aged 66)) was an American professor and educator. He received his A.B. from Northwestern University and his Ph.D. from the University of Chicago. He became a member of the Sigma Chi Fraternity during his college years.

He was president of the Episcopal Church National Council of Churchmen for several years.

He was in the classics department of Northwestern University from 1930 to 1943. He was the seventh president of Ripon College from 1943 to 1954 and the third provost of the Santa Barbara College of the University of California (now University of California, Santa Barbara) for a short period in 1955. He later entered private business.

In 1965, he was on the board of the Fulbright Commission in Brazil.

References

External links
"Prof Insists He's Innocent in Sex Case"
Mention of Clark G. Kuebler's death 

University of California, Santa Barbara faculty
University of Chicago alumni
Northwestern University alumni
1908 births
1974 deaths